Tour Perret may refer to: